Bravehearted 2 is the second studio album by American hip hop duo Bravehearts from the Queensbridge, New York, who have served as New York City rapper Nas's entourage since the 1990s. The group used to consist of Jungle (Nas's younger brother), G-Wiz, Horse, Nashawn and later, Lakey the Kid, but due to personal differences the group split up, and now BraveHearts is currently a duo consisting of remaining members Jungle and Nashawn.

Track listing

References

2008 albums
Bravehearts albums
Albums produced by DJ Honda